Sympistis wilsonensis is a species of moth in the family Noctuidae (the owlet moths).

The MONA or Hodges number for Sympistis wilsonensis is 10110.

References

Further reading

 
 
 

wilsonensis
Articles created by Qbugbot
Moths described in 1924